General elections were held in the Gold Coast on 15 June 1954. The result was a victory for Kwame Nkrumah's Convention People's Party, which won 71 of the 104 seats.

Background
The election was held following the approval of a new constitution on 29 April 1954. The new constitution meant that assembly members were no longer elected by the tribal councils, the Assembly was enlarged, and all members were chosen by direct election from equal, single-member constituencies. It established a cabinet composed of African ministers, and only defense and foreign policy remained in the hands of the governor; the elected assembly was given control over the majority of internal affairs.

Results

Aftermath
In May 1956, Nkrumah's government issued a white paper containing proposals for Gold Coast independence. The British Government stated it would agree to a firm date for independence if a reasonable majority for such a step were obtained in the Gold Coast Legislative Assembly after a general election. This election was held in July 1956, and resulted in another win for the CPP. Gold Coast became the independent nation of Ghana on 6 March 1957.

See also
List of MLAs elected in the 1954 Gold Coast legislative election

References

Elections in Ghana
Gold Coast
General
Gold Coast
Election and referendum articles with incomplete results